Nathrius brevipennis is a species of beetle in family Cerambycidae. It is found (and originated) in the Palearctic    but has been spreading by commerce (with timber and wood packaging) and is now cosmopolitan.
It is 4–7 mm. long. It is polyphagous on dead twigs of dominantly broadleaved trees (Alnus, Rosa, Fraxinus, Corylus, Ficus, Castanea, Salix, Juglans, Quercus, Morus, Cornus, Ceratonia, Pistacia, Ziziphus, Robinia Ostrya)

References

Cerambycinae
Beetles described in 1839